KKRC may refer to:

 KKRC-FM, a radio station (97.3 FM) licensed to serve Sioux Falls, South Dakota, United States
 KJEF (AM), a radio station (1290 AM) licensed to serve Jennings, Louisiana, United States, which held the call sign KKRC from 2019 to 2020
 KDMA-FM, a radio station (93.9 FM) licensed to serve Granite Falls, Minnesota, United, States, which held the call sign KKRC from 1990 to 2018
 KRRO, a radio station (103.7 FM) licensed to serve Sioux Falls, South Dakota, which held the call sign KKRC-FM from 1982 to 1990